The Treaty of Buchach was signed on 18 October 1672 in Buczacz (now Buchach, Ukraine) between the Polish–Lithuanian Commonwealth under King Michał Korybut Wiśniowiecki, who had been unable to raise a suitable army, on the one side  and the Ottoman Empire on the other side, ending the first phase of the Polish-Ottoman War (1672-1676).
 
Under the treaty Poland:
 ceded territory of Podolian Voivodeship to the Ottomans 
 agreed to pay a yearly tribute of 22,000 Thaler
 ceded territory of Bratslav Voivodeship and southern Kiev Voivodeship to the Cossack Hetmanate (Ottoman Ukraine), which fought alongside the Ottomans under Petro Doroshenko.

The hostilities would resume already in the spring of 1673 as the Sejm never ratified the treaty. In 1676 it was revised with the Treaty of Żurawno (today in Zhuravne, Stryi Raion).

See also
The Ruin (Ukrainian history)#List of treaties

References

Bibliography

External links
 Treaty of Buchach at the Encyclopedia of Ukraine

Buchach
Buczacz
Islam in Poland
1672 treaties
Buchach
1672 in Europe
Buchach
1672 in the Ottoman Empire
1672 in the Polish–Lithuanian Commonwealth